1913 European Championship may refer to

 1913 European Bandy Championships
 Ice Hockey European Championship 1913